The 2009–10 Hazfi Cup was the 23rd season of the Iranian football knockout competition. Zob Ahan Isfahan was the defending champion.

The cup winner were guaranteed a place in the 2011 AFC Champions League.

Participating teams

Totally 115 teams got permission to participate in the season “2009–10 Hazfi Cup”. These teams were divided into four main groups which are introduced here.

Group 1  (Start their matches from the first round)

In total 33 teams (30 teams from 30 different provinces in Iran (each province: one), 2 additional teams from Tehran province, and 1 team from Kish:

1- Zoratkaran Parsabad (Ardabil Province), 2- Sanat Bargh Tabriz (Azerbaijan Sharqi Province), 3- Shahrdari Piranshahr (Azerbaijan Gharbi Province), 4- Tohid Bushehr (Bushehr Province), 5- Boroojen Foolad Charmahal (Chahar Mahaal va Bakhtiari Province), 6- Montakhab Fars (Fars Province), 7- Malavan Sepid Bandar Anzali (Gilan Province), 8- Shahin Bandar Gaz (Golestan Province), 9- Behzisti Hamedan (Hamadan Province), 10- Keshavarzi Minab (Hormozgan Province), 11- Montakhab Ilam (Ilam Province), 12- Zob Ahan Novin Isfahan (Isfahan Province), 13- Montakhab Kerman (Kerman Province), 14- Ghand Eslam Abad (Kermanshah Province), 15- Montakhab Khorasan Shomali (Khorasan Shomali Province), 16- Otobos Rani Quchan (Khorasan Razavi Province), 17- Montakhab Khorasan Jonoobi (Khorasan Jonoobi Province), 18- Montakhab Khuzaestan (Khuzestan Province), 19- Montakhab Kohgiluyeh (Kohgiluyeh va Boyer-Ahmad Province), 20- Ararat Sanandaj (Kurdistan Province), 21- Dar Tak Lorestan (Lorestan Province), 22- Montakhab Markazi (Markazi Province), 23- Goal Navad Qa'em Shahr (Mazandaran Province), 24- Sandan Iranian Qazvin (Qazvin Province), 25- Panah Afarin Qom (Qom Province), 26- Ansar Siman Shahrood (Semnan Province), 27- Pas Zahedan (Sistan and Baluchistan Province), 28- Naz Saram Meybod Yazd (Yazd Province), 29- Alborz Shahdari Zanjan (Zanjan Province), 30- Montakhab Tehran (Tehran Province), 31- Omid Hasan Abad Tehran (Tehran Province / Tavabe), 32- Shahrdari Karaj (Tehran Province / Karaj), 33- Montakhab Kish (Kish Island)

Group 2  (Start their matches from the first round)

In total 36 teams (All teams playing in Iran Football's 2nd Division):

1- Aflak Lorestan, 2- Ariya Sepahan Qom
, 3- Armin Tehran, 4- Damash Tehran
, 5- Esteghlal Jonub Tehran
, 6- Estghlal Qazvin
, 7- Foolad Yazd
, 8- Golchin Robat Karim
, 9- Hepco Arak
, 10- Heyat Football Chaharmahal
, 11- Heyat Khorasan Jonoobi
, 12- Homa Tehran
, 13- Mashin Sazi Tabriz
, 14- Moghavemat Sari
, 15- Moghavemat Tehran
, 16- Naft Ahvaz
, 17- Naft va Gaz Gachsaran
, 18- Nirooye Zamini Tehran
, 19- Nozhan Mazandaran
, 20- Palayesh Gaz Ilam
, 21- Persepolis Borazjan, 22- Persepolis Ganaveh
, 23- Persepolis Khorasan Shomali
, 24- Persepolis Zahedan, 25- Saipa Shomal Sari
, 26- Sanat Ard Golestan
, 27- Sanat Gaz Sarakhs
, 28- Sanat Naft Novin Abadan
, 29- Sepidrood Rasht
, 30- Shahrdari Bandar Anzali
, 31- Shahrdari Hamedan
, 32- Shahrdari Langarud
, 33- Shahrdari Mahshahr
, 34- Shahrdari Yasuj
, 35- Shahrdari Zanjan
, 36- Zob Ahan Ardebil

Group 3  (Start their matches from the second round)

In total 28 teams (All teams playing in Azadegan League):

1- Aluminium Hormozgan
, 2- Bargh Shiraz
, 3- Damash Gilan
, 4- Damash Lorestan
, 5- Etka Gorgan
, 6- Foolad Novin Ahvaz
, 7- Gol Gohar Sirjan
, 8- Gostaresh Foolad Tabriz
, 9- Iranjavan Bushehr
, 10- Kowsar Lorestan
, 11- Mehrkam Pars Tehran
, 12- Mes Rafsanjan
, 13- Mes Sarcheshme
, 14- Naft Tehran
, 15- Nassaji Mazandaran
, 16- Payam Mashhad
, 17- Payam Mokhaberat Shiraz
, 18- Petrochimi Tabriz
, 19- Sanat Naft Abadan
, 20- Sanati Kaveh Tehran
, 21- Sepahan Novin Isfahan
, 22- Shahin Ahvaz
, 23- Shahrdari Bandar Abbas
, 24- Shahrdari Tabriz
, 25- Shamoushak Noshahr
, 26- Shensa Arak
, 27- Shirin Faraz Kermanshah
, 28- Tarbiat Yazd

Group 4  (Start their matches from the fourth round)

In total 18 teams (All teams playing in Iran Pro League):

1- Aboomoslem
, 2- Esteghlal
, 3- Esteghlal Ahvaz
, 4- Foolad
, 5- Mes Kerman
, 6- Malavan
, 7- Moghavemat
, 8- Pas Hamedan
, 9- Paykan
, 10- Persepolis
, 11- Rahahan
, 12- Saba
, 13- Saipa
, 14- Sepahan
, 15- Shahin Bushehr
, 16- Steel Azin
, 17- Tractor Sazi
, 18- Zob Ahan

First stage

The first round of “2009–10 Hazfi Cup” started with 69 teams. From this round, 36 teams were allowed to go to the second round. From total 69 teams, 3 of them got “Rest” at the first round and other 64 went through 32 matches.

Totally 64 teams (36 teams from the first round and 28 teams from two groups in Azadegan League) went through the second round. From this round, 32 teams went through the third round.

In the third round 16 matches were done and 16 teams were qualified for the next round.

First round

Second round

Third round

Second stage

From this stage the 18 teams from Iran Pro League were entered into the Main Draw. However the number of participating teams were 34 (16 teams from the third round and 18 teams from “Iran Pro League”).

For solving this problem, the total 30 teams (15 teams from the third round and 15 teams from “Iran Pro League”) went directly to the fourth round. For defining the other two, two extra matches were done between 3 teams form Iran Pro League and 1 team from the third round.

Finally 32 teams went through the fourth round (1/16 Final - Last 32).

Extra matches (In order to compensate the Main Draw)

Fourth Round (1/16 Final - Last 32)

Fifth Round (1/8 Final - Last 16)

Quarter-Final (1/4 Final - Last 8)

Semi-final (1/2 final – last 4)

Final

Leg 1

Leg 2

Bracket

Note:     H: Home team,   A: Away team

See also 
 2009–10 Persian Gulf Cup
 2009–10 Azadegan League
 2009–10 Iran Football's 2nd Division
 2009–10 Iran Football's 3rd Division
 Hazfi Cup Final 2010
 Iranian Super Cup
 2009–10 Iranian Futsal Super League

References

Hazfi Cup seasons
Hazfi Cup
Hazfi Cup